Blue Isle Studios is an independent Canadian video game developer based in Toronto, Canada. It was founded in 2010 by Alex Tintor. They gained notoriety with the release of Slender: The Arrival, the official successor to Slender: The Eight Pages. Three years later they released Valley, a fast-paced first person adventure game, which was acclaimed by peers and players alike. In 2017 Blue Isle allowed early access to their third project, Citadel: Forged With Fire, a multiplayer fantasy sandbox with an emphasis on construction and base building. The game was slated to be released in early 2019 and released on November 1, 2019. User reviews were mixed.

Developed games

References

External links

Blue Isle Studios on YouTube
Blue Isle Studios on Twitter
Blue Isle Studios on Facebook
Blue Isle Studios on Instagram

Video game companies established in 2010
Video game companies of Canada
Video game development companies